Ognjen Damjanović (Serbian Cyrillic: Огњен Дамњановић; born 20 April 1985) is a Serbian football forward who plays for Sloboda Užice.

Honours
Napredak Kruševac
Serbian First League: 2015–16

References

External links
 
 Ognjen Damnjanović stats at utakmica.rs
 

1985 births
Living people
Sportspeople from Šabac
Serbian footballers
FK Mačva Šabac players
FK Sileks players
FK Proleter Novi Sad players
Hapoel Nir Ramat HaSharon F.C. players
FK Donji Srem players
FK Voždovac players
FK Napredak Kruševac players
FK TSC Bačka Topola players
FK Inđija players
FK Sloboda Užice players
Serbian First League players
Serbian SuperLiga players
Association football forwards
Serbian expatriate footballers
Serbian expatriate sportspeople in Israel
Expatriate footballers in Israel
Israeli Premier League players
Liga Leumit players